Mary Meyer Gilmore (born November 20, 1947) is a Democratic former member of the Wyoming House of Representatives, representing the 59th district from 2003 until 2009.

References

External links
Wyoming State Legislature - Representative Mary Meyer Gilmore official WY Senate website
Project Vote Smart - Representative Mary Meyer Gilmore (WY) profile
Follow the Money - Mary Meyer Gilmore
2006 2004 2002 campaign contributions

Democratic Party members of the Wyoming House of Representatives
1947 births
Living people
Women state legislators in Wyoming
Politicians from Casper, Wyoming
21st-century American women politicians
21st-century American politicians